The 2011 Fed Cup (also known as the 2011 Fed Cup by BNP Paribas for sponsorship purposes) was the 49th edition of the tournament between national teams in women's tennis.

The final took place at the Olympic Stadium in Moscow, Russia, on 5–6 November. Czech Republic defeated the home team, Russia, to win their sixth title and first as an independent nation.

World Group

Draw

World Group play-offs 

The four losing teams in the World Group first round ties (Australia, France, Slovakia and United States), and four winners of the World Group II ties (Spain, Germany, Serbia and Ukraine) entered the draw for the World Group Play-offs. Four seeded teams, based on the latest Fed Cup ranking, were drawn against four unseeded teams.

Date: 16–17 April

World Group II 

The World Group II was the second highest level of Fed Cup competition in 2011. The winners advanced to the World Group Play-offs, and the loser playing in the World Group II Play-offs.

Date: 5–6 February

World Group II play-offs 

The four losing teams from World Group II (Estonia, Slovenia, Canada and Sweden) played off against qualifiers from Zonal Group I. Two teams qualified from Europe/Africa Zone (Belarus and Switzerland), one team from the Asia/Oceania Zone (Japan), and one team from the Americas Zone (Argentina).

Date: 16–17 April

Americas Zone 

 Nations in bold advanced to the higher level of competition.
 Nations in italics were relegated down to a lower level of competition.

Group I 
Venue: Tenis Club Argentino, Buenos Aires, Argentina (outdoor clay)

Dates: February 2–5

Participating Teams

Group II 
Venue: Centro Nacional de Tenis, Santo Domingo, Dominican Republic (outdoor hard)

Dates: May 16–22

Participating Teams

Asia/Oceania Zone 

 Nations in bold advanced to the higher level of competition.
 Nations in italics were relegated down to a lower level of competition.

Group I 
Venue: National Tennis Centre, Nonthaburi, Thailand (outdoor hard)

Dates: February 2–5

Participating Teams

Group II 
Venue: National Tennis Centre, Nonthaburi, Thailand (outdoor hard)

Dates: February 2–5

Participating Teams

Europe/Africa Zone 

 Nations in bold advanced to the higher level of competition.
 Nations in italics were relegated down to a lower level of competition.

Group I 
Venue: Municipal Tennis Club, Eilat, Israel (outdoor hard)

Dates: February 2–5

Participating Teams

Group II 
Venue: Smash Tennis Academy, Cairo, Egypt (outdoor clay)

Dates: May 4–7

Participating Teams

Group III 
Venue: Smash Tennis Academy, Cairo, Egypt (outdoor clay)

Dates: May 2–7

Participating Teams

Rankings 
The rankings were measured after the three points during the year that play took place, and were collated by combining points earned from the previous four years.

See also 
 2012 Fed Cup

References

External links 
 2011 Fed Cup

 
Fed Cup
Billie Jean King Cups by year
2011 in women's tennis